DIN sync, also called Sync24, is a synchronization interface for electronic musical instruments. It was introduced in 1980 by Roland Corporation and has been superseded by MIDI.

Definition and history 

DIN sync was introduced in 1980 by Roland Corporation with the release of the  TR-808 drum machine. The intended use was the synchronization of music sequencers, drum machines, arpeggiators and similar devices. It was superseded by MIDI in the mid-to-late 1980s. 

DIN sync consists of two signals, clock (tempo) and run/stop. Both signals are TTL compatible, meaning the low state is 0 V and the high state is about +5 V. The clock signal is a low-frequency pulse wave suggesting the tempo.  Instead of measuring the waveform's frequency, the machine receiving the signal merely has to count the number of pulses to work out when to increment its position in the music.  Roland equipment uses 24 pulses per quarter note, known as Sync24. Therefore, a Roland-compatible device playing sixteenth notes would have to advance to the next note every time it receives 6 pulses.  Korg equipment uses 48 pulses per quarter note. The run/stop signal indicates whether the sequence is playing or not.

If a device is a DIN sync sender, the positive slope of start/stop must reset the clock signal, and the clock signal must start with a delay of 9 ms.

A detailed description on how to implement a DIN sync sender with Play, Pause, Continue and Stop functionality was published by E-RM Erfindungsbuero.

Pinouts
DIN sync is so named because it uses 5-pin DIN connectors, the same as used for MIDI.  DIN sync itself is not a DIN standard.  Note that despite using the same connectors as MIDI, it uses different pins on these connectors (1, 2, and 3 rather than MIDI's 2, 4 and 5), so a cable made specifically for MIDI will not necessarily have the pins required for DIN sync connected.  In some applications the remaining DIN sync pins (4 and 5) are used as tap and fill in or reset and start, but this differs from one device to another.

Some manufacturers offer DIN sync over a 3.5 mm TRS mini-jack connection. Similar to the MIDI standard over TRS minijack, the aim is to reduce space in the device with a smaller connector.

Relation to other clock systems

Other clock systems 

The MIDI interface uses the same 5-pin DIN connectors but is electrically not compatible with DIN sync. The MIDI protocol features a MIDI beat clock. MIDI beat clock also works with 24 ticks per quarter note. MIDI timecode is used for more general timecode synchronization applications.

Analog clock signals are equivalent to the clock signal at pin 3 of DIN sync interface. The clock rate is usually higher than the DIN sync's rate. Typical values are 48, 96 or 192 pulses per quarter note (examples: Oberheim DMX, DX, DSX; LinnDrum 1 and 2).

Analog trigger signals transfer a pulse per musical event. For instance, a trigger corresponds to a step of an analog sequencer or an arpeggiator, a step in a rhythm pattern. Typical analog triggers run at four pulses per quarter note.

Combining with other clock systems 

The combination of DIN sync with a different clock system can be achieved either by converting the format or the clock rate (see list below) or by using a central unit (so-called master clock), which provides multiple clock formats. The approach with a master clock is usually chosen, especially if synchronization with absolute time is required, such as synchronization with a tape recorder or with video footage.

Typical devices which can act as a master clock and provide DIN sync include the Roland SBX-80, Roland SBX-10, Friendchip SRC, E-RM midiclock⁺ and Yamaha MSS1. Many drum machines which have DIN sync and MIDI clock outputs can act as master clock for those two formats.

Converting from and to other clock systems 

Though DIN sync and MIDI clock have the same clock rate, they require a conversion of the format within a microprocessor or similar. The conversion from MIDI clock to DIN sync is available in many industrial devices. The conversion from DIN sync to MIDI clock can be performed by devices such as 'Sync-Split2' from Innerclock Systems, or D-Sync by Kenton Electronics. Also two no longer produced devices do this type of conversion: Roland SBX10, Korg KMS30. On September 1st 2014, Roland introduced the SBX-1 which provides MIDI to sync24 or sync48 conversion.

To get an analog trigger or clock from the DIN syncs clock signal one has to use digital frequency division or frequency multiplication. There are no dedicated industrial devices that provide a division. The Roland SBX10 can convert into a 48, 96, and 120 PPQN clock.

Devices 

Some devices have a DIN sync input as well as DIN sync output, other devices have only a single DIN socket which sometimes can be switched between input and output.

Note that sync48 devices can be combined with sync24 devices if 32nd notes are programmed instead of 16th notes.

References

External links 

Doepfer general FAQ: Sync specification
E-RM Erfindungsbuero DIN Sync implementation report
Philip Rees MDS
Sync Unit DC - freeware DIN Sync generator
ByteNoise: DIN sync

Synchronization
Electronic musical instruments